Anitha Bondestam (born 1941) is a German-born Swedish jurist who served as the minister of communications (Transport) in the Ullsten Cabinet in the period 1978–1979. She also held several official positions.

Biography
Bondestam was born in Danzig, Germany in 1941. However, in a study by Hanna Bäck et. al. (2008) it is stated that she was born in Poland.

She received a bachelor's degree in law from Uppsala University.

Bondestam started her career as a jurist at the district courts in 1964 and worked at different courts until 1974. She was a legal advisor for the ministry of commerce from 1972 to 1973 and for the ministry of justice between 1974 and 1977. She was head of operations at the ministry of communications in 1977. She served as the minister of communications (Transport) from 1978 to 1979. She was chairman of the gender equality board for two terms.

After leaving politics Bondestam served as the justice administrator of the court of appeal in Gothenburg between 1980 and 1992. Then she held other positions at the legal system.

References

External links

20th-century Swedish judges
20th-century Swedish women politicians
21st-century Swedish judges
1941 births
Liberals (Sweden) politicians
Living people
Swedish people of German descent
Swedish women judges
Uppsala University alumni
Women government ministers of Sweden
Swedish Ministers for Communications
20th-century women judges
21st-century women judges